Kingsford is a brand of charcoal briquette used for grilling, along with related products. Established in 1920, the brand is owned by The Clorox Company. Currently, the Kingsford Products Company remains the leading manufacturer of charcoal in the United States, with 80% market share. More than 1 million tons of wood scraps are converted into charcoal briquettes annually.

History
Ford Motor Company sold more than one million Ford Model Ts in 1919. Each one used 100 board feet of wood for parts such as frame, dashboard, steering wheel and wheels. Because of the amount of wood used, Henry Ford decided to produce his own supply. He enlisted the help of Edward G. Kingsford, a real estate agent in Michigan, to locate a supply of wood.  Kingsford’s wife was a cousin of Ford. In the early 1920s, Ford acquired large timberland in Iron Mountain, Michigan, and built a sawmill and parts plant in a neighboring area which became Kingsford, Michigan. The mill and plants produced sufficient parts for the car, but generated waste such as stumps, branches and sawdust. Ford suggested that all wood scraps be processed into charcoal.

A University of Oregon chemist, Orin Stafford, had invented a method for making pillow-shaped lumps of fuel from sawdust and mill waste combined with tar and bound together with cornstarch. He called the lumps "charcoal briquettes." Thomas Edison designed the briquette factory adjacent to the sawmill, and Kingsford ran it. It was a model of efficiency, producing  of briquettes for every ton of scrap wood.  The product was sold only through Ford dealerships. Ford named the new business Ford Charcoal and dubbed the charcoal blocks "briquets". At the beginning, the charcoal was sold to meat and fish smokehouses, but demand exceeded supply.

By the mid-1930s, Ford was marketing "Picnic Kits" containing charcoal and portable grills at Ford dealerships, capitalizing on the link between motoring and outdoor adventure that his own Vagabond travels popularized. "Enjoy a modern picnic," the package suggested. "Sizzling broiled meats, steaming coffee, toasted sandwiches." It wasn’t until after World War II that backyard barbecuing took off, thanks to suburban migration, the invention of the Weber grill and the marketing efforts. An investment group bought Ford Charcoal in 1951 and renamed it to Kingsford Charcoal in honor of Edward G. Kingsford (and the factory's home-base name) and took over the operations. The plant was later acquired by Clorox in 1973.

Manufacturing

Kingsford Charcoal is made from charred soft and hardwoods such as pine, spruce, hickory, oak and others depending on which regional manufacturing plant it comes from.  That char is then mixed with ground coal and other ingredients to make a charcoal briquette. As of January 2016, Kingsford Charcoal contains the following ingredients:

 Wood char - Fuel for heating
 Mineral char - Fuel for heating
 Mineral carbon - Fuel for heating
 Limestone - Binding agent
 Starch - Binding agent
 Borax - Release agent
 Sawdust - Accelerate ignition

The raw materials, primarily wood waste from regional sawmills, are delivered to the factory. The wood waste is fed into pits to undergo magnetic filtration to remove any metallic parts. The wood waste is then ground into fine particles and whisked with hot air to remove any moisture. The wood particles are later processed through a large furnace with multiple hearths (called a retort) in a controlled-oxygen atmosphere. The particles are stacked in batches in a kiln that chars the wood without burning in a controlled-oxygen atmosphere. The wood is progressively charred as it drops from one hearth to the next. The charred wood particles are combined with the other ingredients, press formed into pillow-shaped briquettes and dried before being packaged for sale. Kingsford has also begun retailing a charcoal product that combines their charcoal with spices to create flavored smoke.

Plant locations

Charcoal facilities

 Burnside, Kentucky
 Springfield, Oregon
 Belle, Missouri
 Summer Shade, Kentucky
 Parsons, West Virginia

Retort facilities

 Glen, Mississippi 
 Beryl, West Virginia

References

External links
 

Charcoal
Clorox brands
Products introduced in 1920